Michael Manley, often known as Mike Manley (born 6 March 1964) is a British businessman and CEO of AutoNation. He previously served as managing director of the North American operations of Stellantis. In 2018 Manley was appointed as CEO of Fiat Chrysler Automobiles (FCA), following the announcement that previous CEO Sergio Marchionne would step down due to health reasons.

Career
Manley was educated as an engineer and started his career as a trainee at car financing company Swan National. He continued his career working at Renault and Peugeot dealerships, before moving on to Lex Autosales car dealerships. In 2000, Lex Autosales was bought by DaimlerChrysler UK, and Manley was appointed director of Network Development for DaimlerChrysler UK, but was soon transferred to the United States in 2003. In 2008, he became Executive Vice-President of planning and sales for Chrysler followed by COO for the Asia region. In 2009, Manley became the CEO of the Jeep division, a position which he held with FCA since the merger with Fiat, with the addition of becoming responsible for RAM. During his tenure, Jeep sales rose from 320,000 vehicles in 2009 to 1.23 million in 2015. Manley has said that being appointed the head of Jeep was 'the turning point of his career'.

On 21 July 2018 Manley was appointed CEO of FCA, as Sergio Marchionne stepped down for medical reasons. During his first year as CEO he has been noted for attracting FCA outsiders and automobile industry outsiders for management positions and for untangling the management structure of FCA.

In December 2020 it was announced that Manley will lead the North American operations of Stellantis, once the FCA-PSA merger is finalized. He left Stellantis in September 2021. Starting November 2021 Manley will serve as CEO of AutoNation. He will also join the board of the Stellantis Foundation, which manages the charity activities of Stellantis.

Personal
Manley has been described as a workaholic who is demanding of his co-workers. "Those working for him 'recognize' a stern, focused demand for high performance, innovative ideas, fast reaction, allegiance to success and the metrics to prove it." Manley considers Stellantis CEO Carlos Tavares a friend and has known him for 10 years.

Awards and honours
 Automotive Hall of Fame Distinguished Service Citation 2016
 Auto Express Hall of Fame 2016
 2016 Detroit Free Press Automotive Difference Maker Award

References

1964 births
Living people
English businesspeople
Chief executives in the automobile industry
Chief operating officers
Chrysler executives
Fiat Chrysler Automobiles
People from Edenbridge, Kent
People in the automobile industry
Stellantis